Barney Peter Gibson (born 31 March 1996) is a former English cricketer who played as a wicket-keeper for Yorkshire. He is the youngest cricketer to play first-class cricket in England making his debut for Yorkshire in April 2011 aged 15 years and 27 days.

Early life
Gibson was born in Leeds, England and attended Crawshaw School in Pudsey. Before making his first-class debut, he represented Yorkshire County Cricket Club at Under-11, Under-12 and Under-13 levels. He had also played at schoolboy level for Leeds United, whose books he had been on between the ages of eight and twelve, before giving up football to concentrate on cricket.

Playing career

Club cricket
Gibson plays his club cricket for Bradford Cricket League side Pudsey Congs, becoming the first team wicket-keeper at the age of 14.

First-class career
Gibson made his debut for Yorkshire in a three-day match against the Durham MCC University (Durham MCCU) on 27 April 2011 at the age of 15 years, 27 days beating the previous record held for 144 years by Charles Young who had represented Hampshire at the age of 15 years, 131 days in 1867. He was selected ahead of Jonny Bairstow and Gerard Brophy, the two first-choice wicket-keepers, who were rested by Yorkshire. To make his debut, his school gave him permission to miss lessons. Gibson was glad to avoid school that day, stating:

He made two catches in the first innings and four in the second innings of his debut match, two each off the bowling of Oliver Hannon-Dalby, David Wainwright and Ajmal Shahzad.

On 3 April 2015, it was announced that Gibson had left Yorkshire and retired from cricket to pursue other career options.

References

External links
 
 

1996 births
Living people
Cricketers from Leeds
Yorkshire cricketers
English cricketers
Cricketers from Pudsey
English cricketers of the 21st century
Wicket-keepers